The Play-offs of the 2011 Fed Cup Europe/Africa Zone Group I were the final stages of the Group I Zonal Competition involving teams from Europe and Africa. Using the positions determined in their pools, the fifteen teams faced off to determine their placing in the 2011 Fed Cup Europe/Africa Zone Group I. The top two teams advanced to World Group II play-offs, and the bottom two teams were relegated down to the Europe/Africa Zone Group II.

Promotion play-offs
The first placed teams of each pool were drawn in head-to-head rounds. The winner of each round advanced to the World Group II play-offs, where they'd get a chance to advanced to World Group II.

Belarus vs. Poland

Netherlands vs. Switzerland

5th to 8th play-offs
The second placed teams of each pool were drawn in head-to-head rounds to find the equal fifth and seventh placed teams.

Croatia vs. Great Britain

Israel vs. Romania

9th to 12th play-offs
The third placed teams of each pool except Pool A were drawn in head-to-head rounds to find the equal ninth and the eleventh placed teams.

Austria vs. Luxembourg

  was not drawn against anyone due to the odd number of teams in Pool A. As such, Hungary was automatically named an equal 9th team along with Austria.

Relegation play-offs
The last placed teams of each pool were drawn in head-to-head rounds. The loser of each round was relegated down to Europe/Africa Zone Group II in 2012.

Denmark vs. Greece

Bulgaria vs. Latvia

Final Placements

  advanced to the World Group II Play-offs, where they were drawn against . They won 5–0, and as such progressed through to World Group II for 2012. Their win against Estonia was the most decisive in Fed Cup history, with Estonia winning only thirteen games.
  advanced to the World Group II Play-offs, where they were drawn against . They won 4–1, and as such progressed through to World Group II for 2012.
Both teams were positioned in the relegation play-offs, where they were drawn against each other. The Latvians won, meaning they remained in Group II for 2013, while the Danes lost and were relegated down to Group III.

See also
Fed Cup structure

References

External links
 Fed Cup website

2011 Fed Cup Europe/Africa Zone